Uricemia may refer to:

 Hyperuricemia
 Hypouricemia
 Uric acid